Roh Jeong-eui (born July 31, 2001) is a South Korean actress. She is known for her role as Dong-i in 2016 film Phantom Detective, Hong Si-a in 18 Again (2020), and NJ in Our Beloved Summer (2021-22).

Filmography

Film

Television series

Web series

Hosting

Music video

Awards and nominations

References

External links

 
 

2001 births
Living people
South Korean television actresses
South Korean film actresses
South Korean child actresses
21st-century South Korean actresses